Paya Rumput is a town in Melaka Tengah District, Malacca, Malaysia. It has three residential areas: Taman Paya Rumput Perdana, Taman Paya Rumput Utama and Taman Paya Emas.

Business
 GJH Holdings Sdn Bhd
 Honesteel Sdn Bhd

Tourist attractions
 Masbro Village

References

 

Central Melaka District
Towns in Malacca